High Master may refer to:

 The Hochmeister or Grand Masters of the Teutonic Knights
 High Master (academic), denoting the heads of St Paul's School (London) and Manchester Grammar School